The International Journal of Geriatric Psychiatry is a peer-reviewed medical journal covering research in geriatric psychiatry.

See also
 List of psychiatry journals

External links 
 

Psychiatry journals
Publications established in 1986
Monthly journals
Wiley (publisher) academic journals
English-language journals
Gerontology journals